The President of Savannah State University is the chief operating officer of the university.  The position is sometimes called the chancellor or rector, at other American colleges and universities. There have been fourteen presidents and five acting presidents in the history of Savannah State University.

Notes
A.On April 19, 2011 the Georgia Board of Regents for the University System of Georgia voted not renew Dr. Earl Yarbrough's annual contract as president of the university.
B.Cheryl Davenport Dozier was named as acting president of the university on April 21, 2011.  The Georgia Board of Regents named Dr. Dozier the permanent president on May 9, 2012.

References